Nellie Hermann is an American writer who lives in New York, and the author of two novels. Her debut novel was The Cure for Grief (Simon & Schuster, 2008); her second novel, The Season of Migration, deals with Vincent van Gogh's time in Belgium, and uses the artist's correspondence along with fabricated letters.

Early life
Born in Boston and raised in Newton, Massachusetts, Hermann attended Brown University before getting her MFA at Columbia University.

References

External links
Nellie Hermann's website

Living people
21st-century American novelists
21st-century American women writers
Writers from Boston
People from Brooklyn
Brown University alumni
Columbia University School of the Arts alumni
American women novelists
Novelists from New York (state)
Novelists from Massachusetts
People from Newton, Massachusetts
Year of birth missing (living people)